Raymond Meddis (23 July 1944 – 25 November 2018) was a British auditory psychologist.  He was a professor of psychology at University of Essex since 1996, emeritus since 2011.

Since 1997, Meddis was one of the principals of the multi-site Center for the Neural Basis of Hearing, along with co-chairs Roy D. Patterson and Ian Winter of Cambridge University and others.

References

External links
Raymond Meddis on Google Scholar showing h-index of 42

British psychologists
1944 births
2018 deaths